Olivier, Olivier is a 1992 drama film directed by Agnieszka Holland. It entered the competition at the 49th Venice International Film Festival and won an award at the 1992 Valladolid International Film Festival.

The plot involves a nine-year-old boy who disappears. When, six years later, he reappears in Paris, there are doubts about his identity.

Cast
Grégoire Colin as Olivier
Frédéric Quiring as Marcel
Faye Gatteau as Nadine petite
Emmanuel Morozof as Olivier petit
Brigitte Roüan as Elisabeth Duval
François Cluzet as Serge Duval

References

External links

New York Times synopsis: http://movies.nytimes.com/movie/36183/Olivier-Olivier/overview

1992 films
1992 drama films
French drama films
1990s French-language films
Films directed by Agnieszka Holland
Films scored by Zbigniew Preisner
1990s French films